Abimelech (’) was the king of Shechem and a son of biblical judge Gideon. His name can best be interpreted as "my father is king", claiming the inherited right to rule. He is introduced in Judges 8:31 as the son of Gideon and his Shechemite concubine, and the biblical account of his reign is described in chapter nine of the Book of Judges. According to the Bible, he was an unprincipled and ambitious ruler who often engaged in war against his own subjects.

Ascension to nobility

The killing of seventy brothers 
According to the Book of Judges, Abimelech went to Shechem to meet with his uncles and grandfather of his mother's side, and claimed to them that he should be the sole ruler over them and Shechem and not his brothers. He asked them whether they'd prefer to be ruled by seventy rulers or just by the individual, and he affirmed them as equal brothers. Because of Abimelech's affirmation to them, the men inclined to follow him, and gave him seventy silver shekels from the Temple of Baal Berith. He and the men then traveled to Ophrah for Gideon's home to kill Gideon's seventy sons, Abimelech's brothers; they were killed on the same stone, but only one had escaped, Jotham.

Abimelech declared king 
Since Abimelech was merely a son of Gideon's concubine, he made good of his claim to rule over Manasseh by killing his half-brothers. Jotham was the youngest brother and the only one to have escaped Abimelech's onslaught. Abimelech was later proclaimed king by the citizens of Beth-millo and Shechem. When Jotham was informed of this news, he went on top of Mount Gerizim and cursed the people of Shechem and Beth-millo for their proclamation, then fled to Beer to hide from Abimelech.

Battles of Shechem

First Battle of Shechem 
Gaal and his brothers arrive at Shechem only to plot a coup against Abimelech with the help of the men of Shechem. Before Gaal could begin his plot, Zebul – who is the governor of Shechem and an officer of Abimelech – heard Gaal's plan and was deeply angered. Zebul then sent messengers to inform Abimelech of Gaal's plot. Abimelech planned to ambush Gaal and his followers in front of the city gates through the night towards the morning. He divides his followers by four companies to hide and wait near Shechem. The ambush begins as soon as Gaal stands in front of the gates and fails to respond because of the uncertainty of an actual ambush approaching. Zebul taunts Gaal into fighting Abimelech. Gaal soon fights Abimelech during the battle but fails and is forced to flee with his forces. Zebul chases Gaal out of Shechem while Abimelech proceeded to Arumah.

Second Battle of Shechem 

The next day, the people of Shechem went out into the fields. After Gaal was driven away, Abimelech gathered three companies by dividing his followers to attack the people in the fields for turning against him and siding with Ga'al. One company went to the gate and the other two attack the people in the fields. Then, Abimelech went into the city and killed the rest and spread salt around so nothing would grow there for a long time. The remaining resistance went to the tower of El-Berith to hold their ground. Abimelech hastily gathered his followers to Mount Zalmon to explain his plan. He grabbed an ax to cut down the bough of a tree and ordered everyone to follow his example. The boughs were placed and set ablaze around the tower, killing the remaining resistance along with a thousand civilians.

Battle of Thebaz and the death of King Abimelech 
The biblical account of the Battle of Thebaz begins in the middle of the siege. Already, Abimelech has taken most of the city and comes upon a heavily fortified tower. The civilians head towards the top of a tower while he fights his way through. Abimelech successfully fights most of the way towards the tower, however, a woman struck his head with a stone above. Realizing the wound was mortal, he ordered his armor-bearer to thrust him through with his sword, so nobody would know he was killed by a woman.

The Legends of the Jews 
Lewis Ginzberg's "The Legends of the Jews" records the following remarks on Abimelech: "In those days the Israelites were so addicted to the worship of Beelzebub that they constantly carried small images of this god with them in their pockets, and every now and then they were in the habit of 
bringing the image forth and kissing it fervently. Of such idolaters were the vain and light fellows who helped Abimelech, the son of Gideon by his concubine from Shechem, to assassinate the other sons of his father. But God is just. As Abimelech murdered his brothers upon a stone, so Abimelech
himself met his death through a millstone. It was proper, then, that Jotham, in his parable, should compare Abimelech to a thorn-bush, while he characterized his predecessors, Othniel, Deborah, and Gideon, as an olive-tree, or a fig-tree, or a vine. This Jotham, the youngest of the sons of Gideon, was more than a teller of parables. He knew then that long afterward the Samaritans would claim sanctity for Mount Gerizim, on account of the blessing pronounced from it upon the tribe. For this reason he chose Gerizim from which to hurl his curse upon Shechem and it inhabitants.""Tan B 1 103. The parable of Jotham is said to refer to the prominent judges: Othniel [=Olive tree], Deborah [=fig tree], Gideon [=vine], and Elimelech [=bramble]. Tan. also states that Abimelech reigned for three years, as a reward for the modesty of his father Gideon, who in a "tripartite"  sentence refused the royal crown offered him by his people; see Jud. 8.23. Abimelech, in contrast to his father [Jud.8.27], was very greedy for riches, and his end therefore came speedily; Aggadat Bereshit 26, 54., see also ibid., 52-53 where Abimelech wickedness and greed was contrasted with the piety and liberality  of his namesake Abimelech, the King of Getar. The ingratitude of the  Israelites who permitted Abimelech to murder the children of their benefactor Gideon was counted unto them as though they had forsaken God; ingratitude is as grave a sin as idolatry; Yelammedenu in Yalkut II, 64."

Citations

Bibliography

External links 
 
 Book of Judges article in Jewish Encyclopedia

Book of Judges monarchs
Massacres in the Bible
Biblical murderers